Sir Lewis Amherst Selby-Bigge, 1st Baronet   (3 April 1860 – 24 May 1951) was a British civil servant, barrister, and scholar who was Permanent Secretary at the Board of Education between 1911–1925.

Early life and education

Selby-Bigge was born at Oakwood House in Beckenham, Kent, the second son of Charles Selby Bigge , of Longhorsley, Northumberland, and Katharina Ogle.

He was educated at Winchester College, followed by Christ Church, Oxford, where he earned a B.A. in 1883 with first-class honours in Literae humaniores. He was elected a Fellow of University College, Oxford in 1883 and was a tutor in philosophy for several years. He published multiple works on the doctrines of British moralists and edited their works, including David Hume's A Treatise of Human Nature  and An Enquiry Concerning Human Understanding, with full index. He earned an M.A. from University College in 1886.

Career
Selby-Bigge was called to the Bar at the Inner Temple in 1891. Three years later, he began his career in the civil service as Assistant Charity Commissioner (1894–1902), before joining the Board of Education, serving successively as Assistant Secretary  (1903–07), Principal Assistant Secretary (1907–11) and Permanent Secretary (1911–25).  Reading law proved to be greatly beneficial in his future work researching legislation for the Board, such as the Education Act 1902 and the Education Act 1918.

According to his obituary, 

He was appointed a Companion of the Order of the Bath (CB) in 1905 and promoted to Knight Companion in the same order (KCB) in the 1913 New Year Honours.

In the 1919 New Year Honours, Sir Amherst was created a baronet, of King's Sutton, in the Baronetage of the United Kingdom, effective 14 February 1919. The title became extinct after the death of his only son, John, an artist, in 1973.

In the 1929 general election, he unsuccessfully stood for the Combined English Universities constituency as Unionist Party candidate.

Personal life

On 15 September 1886, Selby-Bigge married Edith Lindsay Davison, daughter of late Right Hon. John Robert Davison, . They had one son and two daughters:

Sir John Amherst Selby-Bigge, 2nd Baronet,  (24 June 1892 – 3 October 1973)
Evelyn Mary Selby-Bigge (16 October 1887), married Capt. Henry Cecil Pember, son of Henry George Pember
Edith Katharine Selby-Bigge (31 March 1889), married Capt. Geoffrey Francis Bowes-Lyon, grandson of 13th Earl and Countess of Strathmore and Kinghorne and first cousin of Queen Elizabeth The Queen Mother, was the mother of:
Sir James Bowes-Lyon (1917–1977), 2nd cousin of Queen Elizabeth II

Sir Amherst died in Lewes, Sussex in 1951.

Bibliography

References

External links

 

1860 births
1951 deaths
People educated at Winchester College
Alumni of Christ Church, Oxford
Alumni of University College, Oxford
Fellows of University College, Oxford
English barristers
Members of the Inner Temple
English civil servants
People from Beckenham
Knights Companion of the Order of the Bath
Permanent Secretaries of the Board of Education
Baronets in the Baronetage of the United Kingdom